The 1997 Mobiline Cellulars season was the eighth season of the franchise in the Philippine Basketball Association (PBA). The team change its moniker from Cellulars to Mobiline Phone Pals beginning the Governor's Cup.

Draft picks

Notable date
February 23: Rookie Patrick Fran saved the day for the Cellulars in the 84–78 victory over Purefoods Corned Beef Cowboys which clawed back from a 20-point deficit to come close to within three with still 71 seconds remaining. Mobiline scored their first win of the season after losing to defending champion Alaska Milkmen on opening day a week ago.

Occurrences
Former San Miguel coach Norman Black became the new head coach of Mobiline Cellulars, replacing Yeng Guiao at the start of the season. Coach Black steered the team to a semifinal stint in the All-Filipino Cup after two years of being a doormat. After the Cellulars got eliminated in the Commissioner's Cup, Mobiline top honcho Choy Cojuangco and RFM chairman Joey Concepcion agreed on a player-coach trade during the first week of August. Norman Black will now coached his third team in 13 years with Pop Cola while Bottlers' team consultant Derrick Pumaren will moved to the Cellulars.

Mobiline also acquired Ato Agustin from Pop Cola in exchange for Elpidio Villamin and Peter Martin. Starting the Governor's Cup, former Grandslam coach Tommy Manotoc has taken Norman Black's place at the Mobiline bench with Derrick Pumaren as his co-mentor.

Roster

Transactions

Additions

Trades

Subtractions
{| cellspacing="0"
| valign="top" |

Recruited imports

References

TNT Tropang Giga seasons
Mobiline